Part X of the Constitution of India consists of Articles on the scheduled and Tribal Areas.

Article 224

Administration of scheduled areas and tribal areas.

Fifth scheduled and tribal areas

10 states have this area 

Himachal Pradesh, Rajasthan, Gujarat Maharashtra, Chhattisgarh, Jharkhand, Odisha, Madhya Pradesh, Andhra Pradesh Telangana

6th scheduled areas

Tribes of 4 North-eastern states

Article 244A
Formation of an autonomous State comprising certain tribal areas in Assam and creation of local Legislature or Council of Ministers or both thereof.

References

Sources

Part X text from wikisource

Part 10